John Stegeman (born 27 August 1976) is a Dutch professional football manager and former footballer.

Playing career
During his footballing career, Stegeman played as a centre-forward in the Dutch Eerste Divisie, except for his debut season with Vitesse, which was in the Eredivisie. He made his debut for Vitesse on 30 March 1996 in an away match against Fortuna Sittard. After making six additional appearances during the season, he was loaned to Helmond Sport in the summer of 1996. After being released by Vitesse a year later, he played for Go Ahead Eagles, Heracles Almelo, AGOVV Apeldoorn and Cambuur Leeuwarden. In the summer of 2007, he retired from professional football.

Managerial career
Stegeman joined the technical staff of Heracles in June 2008. On 31 August 2014 the then head coach of Heracles, Jan de Jonge, was fired. Stegeman was temporarily appointed as head coach together with René Kolmschot. On 17 September 2014 this appointment was made permanent until the end of the season.
At the end of the 2017–18 season Stegemans and Heracles decided to part ways.

Stegemans became the head coach of Go Ahead Eagles at the start of the 2018-19 season.

On 29 May, after just missing promotion to the Eredivisie, Stegeman announced he was leaving Go Ahead Eagles to join their rivals PEC Zwolle. After disappointing results, including a 3–2 defeat against relegation candidate FC Emmen, Stegeman was dismissed by the club management on 20 February 2021.

Personal life
On 5 September 2019, Stegeman was involved in a solo traffic accident with his blood alcohol content three times the legal limit.

References

Living people
1976 births
Dutch footballers
Association football forwards
Eredivisie players
Eerste Divisie players
SBV Vitesse players
Helmond Sport players
Go Ahead Eagles players
Heracles Almelo players
AGOVV Apeldoorn players
SC Cambuur players
Dutch football managers
Eredivisie managers
Heracles Almelo managers
Go Ahead Eagles managers
PEC Zwolle managers
People from Epe, Netherlands
Heracles Almelo non-playing staff
Footballers from Gelderland